The 2019–20 NBB season was the 12th season of the Novo Basquete Brasil (NBB), the highest level basketball league in Brazil. The season began on 21 September 2019 but was cancelled after 15 March 2020 early when the COVID-19 pandemic broke out in the country.

Team changes

Regular season 

Source: NBB

Statistics

Individual statistical leaders 
Leaders of the regular season before the season was cancelled.

References 

Novo Basquete Brasil seasons
2021–22 in basketball leagues